Phyllocnistis lucernifera is a moth of the family Gracillariidae, known from Maharashtra, India. They mine the leaves of their host plant. The mine has the form of a wandering zigzag gallery on the under surface of the leaf.

References

Phyllocnistis
Endemic fauna of India
Moths of Asia